PAX is a Portuguese comedy film directed by Eduardo Guedes with a screenplay by Bruno Heller. It is part of a film trilogy about Lisbon, ordered for Lisbon's year as European Cultural Capital in 1994.

Synopsis 
Franny (Amanda Plummer), an absent-minded American girl, is in Lisbon to deliver an important package. Unfortunately she has lost the address and only knows that the recipient's name is João. When she meets an old hooker, Esmeralda, the two join forces and begin cruising the town at night, across the streets and the local bars, meeting Lisbon's unconventional night fauna, to try to find João (which would never happen). Franny and Esmeralda open the package to find the contents and final destination of the package.

References

External links 

NYTimes review

Portuguese comedy films